Darti may refer to:
Darti, Borujerd
Darti, Khorramabad